The Popo Agie Formation is a Triassic geologic formation that crops out in western Wyoming, western Colorado, and Utah. It was deposited during the Late Triassic in fluvial (river) and lacustrine (lake) environments that existed across much of what is now the American southwest. Fragmentary fossils of prehistoric reptiles and amphibians, including pseudosuchian reptiles and temnospondyl amphibians, have been discovered in the Popo Agie Formation. Dinosaur remains are also among the fossils that have been recovered from the formation, although none have yet been referred to a specific genus.

Paleobiota

Amphibians

Reptiles

Synapsids

See also

 List of dinosaur-bearing rock formations
 List of stratigraphic units with indeterminate dinosaur fossils

Footnotes

References
 Weishampel, David B.; Dodson, Peter; and Osmólska, Halszka (eds.): The Dinosauria, 2nd, Berkeley: University of California Press. 861 pp. .

Norian Stage
Triassic geology of Wyoming